Dario Vergassola (born 3 May 1957) is an Italian comedian, actor, author, singer-songwriter, television and radio presenter.

Career 
He has worked with all the main Italian television broadcasters and is known for his participation as a comedian in shows such as Maurizio Costanzo Show, Zelig, Mai dire Gol, Parla con me, 2Next, Cartabianca and Quelli che il calcio. He also hosted or co-hosted Bulldozer, Kilimangiaro, Sei in un Paese meraviglioso and two editions of the Concerto del Primo Maggio (2014–15).

Vergassola played the recurring roles of Erminio in the series Dio vede e provvede and Pippo Santi in Carabinieri. He also released two studio albums and published several books with Mondadori, Feltrinelli and Baldini & Castoldi.

Filmography

Discography

Studio albums 
Manovale gentiluomo (Mercury, 1992)
Lunga vita ai pelandroni (Sony Music, 1999)

Singles 
"Mario (Marta)" (1992)

References

External links
 

1957 births
Living people
20th-century Italian male actors
21st-century Italian male actors
Italian comedians
People from La Spezia